Ranuanjärvi is a small and shallow lake of Finland located in the center of municipality of Ranua, in the region of Lapland. It belongs to Iijoki main catchment area.

See also
List of lakes in Finland

References

Iijoki basin
Landforms of Lapland (Finland)
Lakes of Ranua